Peter Baker (10 December 1931 – 27 January 2016) was an English footballer. Educated at Southgate County School in North London, he played right-back for Tottenham Hotspur and was part of the double-winning side of 1960-61 and won the FA Cup with Spurs in 1962. He played 299 league games for Tottenham scoring three goals.

Playing career
Baker joined Tottenham Hotspur from non-League club Enfield in October 1952. After a slow start at Spurs he gained a place in the first team and quickly improved and went on to play a key role in the Spurs Double-winning side of 1960–61.

He stayed with them until the end of the 1964-65 season, keeping a regular place in the team from the 1960–61 season until the end of the 1963-64 season, when he was replaced by Cyril Knowles. After leaving White Hart Lane Baker emigrated to South Africa, where he joined Durban United F.C. and later became the club's manager.

Honours
Tottenham Hotspur
 Football League First Division - 1961
 FA Cup – 1961, 1962
 European Cup Winners Cup – 1963

Post-football career
After retiring from the game he settled in Durban, South Africa, where he ran an office and stationery business.

He has been included in the Tottenham Hotspur Hall of Fame. He died in 2016, aged 84.

References

1931 births
2016 deaths
Footballers from Hampstead
English footballers
Association football fullbacks
Enfield F.C. players
Tottenham Hotspur F.C. players
Durban United F.C. players
Romford F.C. players
English Football League players
People educated at Southgate School
British emigrants to South Africa
FA Cup Final players